Symplocos tubulifera is a species of plant in the family Symplocaceae. It is endemic to Jamaica.

References

Endemic flora of Jamaica
tubulifera
Vulnerable plants
Taxonomy articles created by Polbot